In geotechnical civil engineering, the p–y is a method of analyzing the ability of deep foundations to resist loads applied in the lateral direction. This method uses the finite difference method and p-y graphs to find a solution. P–y graphs are graphs which relate the force applied to soil to the lateral deflection of the soil. In essence, non-linear springs are attached to the foundation in place of the soil. The springs can be represented by the following equation:

 

The p–y curves vary depending on soil type.

The available geotechnical engineering software programs for the p–y method include FB-MultiPier by the Bridge Software Institute, DeepFND by Deep Excavation LLC, PileLAT by Innovative Geotechnics, LPile by Ensoft, and PyPile by Yong Technology.

References

 Salgado, R. (2007).  "The Engineering of Foundations."  McGraw-Hill, in press. (1)
 Hasani, H., Golafshani, A., Estekanchi, H. Seismic performance evaluation of jacket-type offshore platforms using endurance time method considering soil-pile-superstructure interaction. Scientia Iranica, 2017; 24(4): 1843-1854. doi: 10.24200/sci.2017.4275 http://scientiairanica.sharif.edu/article_4275_f79d8b4fdd0cc8d159b91b1a3b968585.pdf

Soil mechanics